The Central Illinois Railroad  was a shortline railroad in Illinois. The switching and terminal railroad operated trackage near Peoria, Illinois. The Central Illinois Railroad was established in 2000, operating on track leased from the Burlington Northern and Santa Fe Railway (BNSF).

The railroad previously operated around eighteen miles of track owned by the BNSF near Chicago, Illinois, but on 30 July 2010 announced that due to financial losses on those lines, BNSF would resume handling operations on those lines on 9 August.

The CIRY was owned by the Railroad Services Group, which also provided contract switching services and track maintenance.

References

Illinois railroads
Railroads in the Chicago metropolitan area
Switching and terminal railroads
Spin-offs of the BNSF Railway
Companies based in Peoria, Illinois